St. Joe or Saint Joe may refer to:

Communities
In the United States:
St. Joe, Arkansas
Port St. Joe, Florida
Saint Joe, Idaho
St. Joe, Illinois
Saint Joe, Indiana
St. Joseph, Michigan, colloquially known as St. Joe
St. Joe, Missouri
Saint Joe, West Virginia
St. Joe, Wisconsin
 St. Joe, Oregon

Parks and geographic features
 St. Joe River, in northern Idaho
 St. Joe National Forest, in the Idaho panhandle
 St. Joe State Park, in Missouri

Other
 St. Joe Company, a land developer

See also
 Saint Joseph (disambiguation)
 Saint Joseph's (disambiguation)